The following were the events of Volleyball for the year 2015 throughout the world.

Beach volleyball
 April 21 – November 13: 2015 FIVB Beach Volleyball World Tour

Beach volleyball championships
 June 26 – July 5: 2015 Beach Volleyball World Championships in the 
 Men's winners:  Alison Cerutti / Bruno Oscar Schmidt
 Women's winners:  Agatha Bednarczuk / Bárbara Seixas
 July 28 – August 2: 2015 European Beach Volleyball Championships in  Klagenfurt
 Men's winners:  Jānis Šmēdiņš / Aleksandrs Samoilovs
 Women's winners:  Laura Ludwig / Kira Walkenhorst
 Men's winners:  Jānis Šmēdiņš / Aleksandrs Samoilovs
 Women's winners:  Larissa França / Talita Antunes
 September 29 – October 4: 2015 World Tour Finals in  Fort Lauderdale, Florida
 Men's winners:  Alison Cerutti / Bruno Oscar Schmidt
 Women's winners:  Larissa França / Talita Antunes

BV Grand Slams
 May 26 – August 30: 2015 FIVB Beach Volleyball Grand Slam
 May 26 – 31: Grand Slam #1 in  Moscow
 Men's winners:  Pablo Herrera / Adrián Gavira
 Women's winners:  Larissa França / Talita Antunes
 June 16 – 21: Grand Slam #2 in  St. Petersburg, Florida
 Men's winners:  Jake Gibb / Casey Patterson
 Women's winners:  Agatha Bednarczuk / Bárbara Seixas
 July 21 – 26: Grand Slam #3 in  Yokohama
 Men's winners:  Alison Cerutti / Bruno Oscar Schmidt
 Women's winners:  Laura Ludwig / Kira Walkenhorst
 August 18 – 23: Grand Slam #4 in  Long Beach, California
 Men's winners:  Alison Cerutti / Bruno Oscar Schmidt
 Women's winners:  Larissa França / Talita Antunes
 August 25 – 30: Grand Slam #5 (final) in  Olsztyn
 Men's winners:  Alison Cerutti / Bruno Oscar Schmidt
 Women's winners:  Larissa França / Talita Antunes

BV Majors
 June 2 – July 12: 2015 FIVB Beach Volleyball Majors
 June 2 – 7: Major #1 in  Poreč
 Men's Winners:  Alexander Brouwer / Robert Meeuwsen
 Women's Winners:  Larissa França / Talita Antunes
 June 9 – 14: Major #2 in  Stavanger
 Men's Winners:  Evandro Gonçalves Oliveira Júnior / Pedro Solberg Salgado
 Women's Winners:  Juliana Silva / Maria Antonelli
 July 7 – 12: Major #3 (final) in  Gstaad
 Men's Winners:  Alison Cerutti / Bruno Oscar Schmidt
 Women's Winners:  Larissa França / Talita Antunes

BV Open
 April 21 – December 13: 2015 FIVB Beach Volleyball Open
 April 21 – 26: Open #1 in  Fuzhou
 Men's winners:  Markus Böckermann / Lars Flüggen

 Women's winners:  Jamie Lynn Broder / Kristina Valjas

 May 12 – 17: Open #2 in  Lucerne
 Men's winners:  Alex Ranghieri / Marco Caminati
 Women's winners:  Karla Borger / Britta Büthe
 May 20 – 24: Open #3 in  Prague (women only)
 Winners:  Ágatha Bednarczuk / Bárbara Seixas
 September 8 – 13: Open #4 in  Sochi
 Men's winners:  Jānis Šmēdiņš / Aleksandrs Samoilovs
 Women's winners:  Marta Menegatti / Viktoria Orsi Toth
 September 22 – 27: Open #5 in  Xiamen
 Men's winners:  Nicholas Lucena / Phil Dalhausser
 Women's winners:  Nadine Zumkehr / Joana Heidrich
 October 6 – 11: Open #6 in  Puerto Vallarta
 Men's winners:  Nicholas Lucena / Phil Dalhausser
 Women's winners:  Laura Ludwig / Kira Walkenhorst
 October 20 – 25: Open #7 in  Antalya
 Men's winners:  Alex Ranghieri / Adrian Ignacio Carambula Raurich
 Women's winners:  Markéta Sluková / Barbora Hermannová
 November 9 – 13: Open #8 (final) in  Doha (men only)
 Winners:  Markus Böckermann / Lars Flüggen

Volleyball

Events

Men's national teams

CAVB 
 July 20 – 31: 2015 Men's African Volleyball Championship in Cairo, Egypt.
: 
: 
:

FIVB 
 May 15 – July 19: 2015 FIVB Volleyball World League
 July 3 – 5: Group 3 Finals in  Bratislava
: 
: 
: 
 July 10 – 12: Group 2 Finals in  Varna
: 
: 
: 
 July 15 – 19: Group 1 Finals in  Rio de Janeiro (Olympic Test Event)
: 
: 
: 
 September 8 – 23: 2015 FIVB Volleyball Men's World Cup in Japan
:  (10 wins and 30 points) (second FIVB Volleyball Men's World Cup title)
:  (10 wins, 29 points, and set ratio of 3.750)
:  (10 wins, 29 points, and set ratio of 2.818)

Club continental champions

Men

Women

Leagues
 June 26 – August 2: 2015 FIVB World Grand Prix
 July 10 – 12: Group 3 Finals in  Canberra
  defeated , 3–1 in matches played, in the final.  took the bronze medal.
 July 31 – August 2: Group 2 Finals in  Lublin
 The  defeated , 3–0 in matches played, in the final.  took the bronze medal.
 July 22 – 26: Group 1 Finals in  Omaha, Nebraska
 The  win their sixth FIVB World Grand Prix title by winning all their matches.
  took the silver medal.  took the bronze medal.
 July 3 – August 14: 2015 Men's European Volleyball League
  defeated , 3–0 in matches played, to win their first Men's European Volleyball League title.  took third place.
 July 30 – September 13: 2015 Women's European Volleyball League
  defeated , 4–3 in matches played, to win their first Women's European Volleyball League title.  and  tied for third place.

World volleyball championships
 August 7 – 16: 2015 FIVB Volleyball Girls' U18 World Championship in  Lima
 August 12 – 19: 2015 FIVB Volleyball Women's U23 World Championship in  Ankara
  defeated , 3–1 in matches played, to win their first FIVB Volleyball Women's U23 World Championship title.  took the bronze medal.
 August 14 – 23: 2015 FIVB Volleyball Boys' U19 World Championship in  Resistencia, Chaco and Corrientes
  defeated , 3–2 in matches played, to win their first FIVB Volleyball Boys' U19 World Championship title.  took the bronze medal.
 August 24 – 31: 2015 FIVB Volleyball Men's U23 World Championship in  Dubai
  defeated , 3–1 in matches played, to win their first FIVB Volleyball Men's U23 World Championship title.  took the bronze medal.
 September 11 – 19: 2015 FIVB Volleyball Women's U20 World Championship in  Caguas, Puerto Rico
 The  defeated , 3–2, in matches played, to win their first FIVB Volleyball Women's U20 World Championship title.  took the bronze medal.
 September 11 – 20: 2015 FIVB Volleyball Men's U21 World Championship in  Tijuana-Mexicali
  defeated , 3–2 in matches played, to win their tenth FIVB Volleyball Men's U21 World Championship title. This includes the 1977, 1981, 1985, and 1989 title wins, when it was part of the unified .  took the bronze medal.

Other volleyball events

African Volleyball Confederation (CAVB)
 January 21 – 24: 2015 African Volleyball Championship U19 in  Kelibia
 Winner:  (5 points)
 Second:  (4 points)
 Third:  (no points)
 February 27 – March 1: 2015 African Volleyball Championship U21 in  Cairo
 Winner:  (6 points)
 Second:  (3 points)
 Third:  (no points)
 February 27 – March 1: 2015 Women's Junior African Volleyball Championship in  Cairo
 Winner:  (6 points)
 Second:  (2 points)
 Third:  (1 point)
 June 12 – 20: 2015 Women's African Volleyball Championship in  Nairobi
  defeated , 3–0 in matches played, to win their ninth Women's African Volleyball Championship title.  took third place.

European Volleyball Confederation (CEV)
 October 25, 2014 – April 12, 2015: 2014–15 CEV Women's Challenge Cup
  Bursa BBSK defeated  Uralochka–NTMK Yekaterinburg, 3–4 in matches played and on aggregate, along with the 15–11 golden set score, to win their first CEV Women's Challenge Cup title. 
 November 4, 2014 – April 11, 2015: 2014–15 Men's CEV Cup
  VC Dynamo Moscow defeated  Energy T.I. Diatec Trentino, 4–4 in matches played and on aggregate, with the 15–12 golden set score, to win their second Men's CEV Cup title.
 November 4, 2014 – April 12, 2015: 2014–15 CEV Challenge Cup
  Vojvodina NS Seme Novi Sad defeated  S.L. Benfica, 5–4 in matches played and on aggregate, to win their first CEV Challenge Cup title.
 November 11, 2014 – April 11, 2015: 2014–15 Women's CEV Cup
  Dinamo Krasnodar defeated  PGE Atom Trefl Sopot, 4–3 in matches played and on aggregate, with the 15–10 golden set score, to win their first Women's CEV Cup title.
 March 28 – April 5: 2015 Girls' Youth European Volleyball Championship in  Samokov and Plovdiv
  defeated , 3–2 in matches played, to win their second Girls' Youth European Volleyball Championship title.  took third place.
 April 4 – 12: 2015 Boys' Youth European Volleyball Championship in  Kocaeli and Sakarya
  defeated , 3–1 in matches played, to win their second Boys' Youth European Volleyball Championship title.  took third place.
  defeated , 3–0 in matches played, to win their first Men's European Volleyball Championship title.  took third place.

Confederación Sudamericana de Voleibol (CSV) 
 February 4 – 8: 2015 Women's South American Volleyball Club Championship in  São Paulo
  Rexona Ades defeated fellow Brazilian team, Molico/Osasco, 3–1 in matches played, to win their second Women's South American Volleyball Club Championship title.  Universidad de San Martín de Porres took third place.
 February 11 – 15: 2015 Men's South American Volleyball Club Championship in  San Juan
  UPCN San Juan defeated  Sada Cruzeiro, 3–2 in matches played, to win their second Men's South American Volleyball Club Championship title.  Lomas took third place.
 September 24 – October 2: 2015 Women's South American Volleyball Championship in  Cartagena
  defeated , 3–0 in matches played, to win their 19th Women's South American Volleyball Championship title.  took third place.
 September 30 – October 4: 2015 Men's South American Volleyball Championship in  Maceió
  defeated , 3–0 in matches played, to win their 25th consecutive and 30th overall Men's South American Volleyball Championship title.  took third place.
 October 18 – 26: 2015 Boys' U17 South American Volleyball Championship in  Cali
 Event cancelled.
 December 9 – 12: 2015 Girls' U16 South American Volleyball Championship in  Tarapoto
  defeated , 3–0 in matches played, to win their second consecutive Girls' U16 South American Volleyball Championship title.  took third place.

North, Central America and Caribbean Volleyball Confederation (NORCECA) 
 May 5 – 10: 2015 NORCECA Girls' Youth U18 Volleyball Final Four in  Lima
 May 21 – 23: 2015 NORCECA Men's Champions Cup (Final Four) in  Detroit
 June 5 – 7: 2015 NORCECA Women's Champions Cup (Final Four) in  Havana
 The  defeated , with 10 points, to win their first NORCECA Women's Champions Cup title.  took third place.
 October 5 – 10: 2015 Men's NORCECA Volleyball Championship in  Córdoba, Veracruz
  defeated , 3–1 in matches played, to win their first Men's NORCECA Volleyball Championship title.  took third place.

Joint CSV & NORCECA events 
 March 17 – 22: 2015 Girls' Youth Pan-American Volleyball Cup in  Havana
 April 17 – 25: 2015 Women's Junior Pan-American Volleyball Cup in  Santo Domingo
 The  defeated , 3–1 in matches played, to win their first Women's Junior Pan-American Volleyball Cup title.  took third place.
 June 13 – 21: 2015 Women's Pan-American Volleyball Cup in  Lima and Callao
 June 23 – 28: 2015 Men's Junior Pan-American Volleyball Cup in  Gatineau
 August 12 – 17: 2015 Men's Pan-American Volleyball Cup in  Reno, Nevada
  defeated , 3–1 in matches played, to win their third Men's Pan-American Volleyball Cup title.  took third place.

Asian Volleyball Confederation (AVC) 
 May 1 – 9: 2015 Asian Women's U23 Volleyball Championship in  Pasig (debut event)
  defeated , 3–1 in matches played, to win the inaugural Asian U23 Women’s Volleyball Championship title.  took third place. 
 May 12 – 20: 2015 Asian Men's U23 Volleyball Championship in  Naypyidaw (debut event)
  defeated , 3–0 in matches played, to win the inaugural Asian U23 Men’s Volleyball Championship title.  took third place.
 May 20 – 28: 2015 Asian Women's Volleyball Championship in  Tianjin
  defeated , 3–0 in matches played, to win their 13th Asian Women's Volleyball Championship title.  took third place. 
 July 31 – August 8: 2015 Asian Men's Volleyball Championship in  Tehran
  defeated , 3–1 in matches played, to win their eighth Asian Men's Volleyball Championship title.  took third place.
 August 13 – 21: 2015 Asian Men's Club Volleyball Championship in  Taipei
  Taichung Bank VC defeated  Al Arabi, 3–1 in matches played, to win their first Asian Men's Club Volleyball Championship title.  Paykan Tehran took third place.
 September 12 – 20: 2015 Asian Women's Club Volleyball Championship in  Hà Nam Province
 Team  Bangkok Glass defeated Team  Hisamitsu Springs, 3–2 in matches played, to win their first Asian Women's Club Volleyball Championship title. Team  Zhejiang took third place.

Volleyball World Cups 
 August 22 – September 6: 2015 FIVB Volleyball Women's World Cup in 
 Winner:  (10 wins and 30 points) (fourth FIVB Volleyball Women's World Cup title)
 Second:  (10 wins and 26 points)
 Third:  (9 wins and 28 points)

Volleyball Hall of Fame
Class of 2015: 
Lloy Ball
Renan Dal Zotto
Fofão
Bebeto de Freitas

References

 
 
Volleyball by year